The German Cooperative Financial Group, sometimes referred to in English as "Volksbanken Raiffeisenbanken Cooperative Financial Network", is a major cooperative banking network in Germany that includes local banks named Volksbanken ("people's banks") and Raiffeisenbanken ("Raiffeisen banks"), the latter in tribute to 19th-century cooperative movement pioneer Friedrich Wilhelm Raiffeisen.

The Bundesverband der Deutschen Volksbanken und Raiffeisenbanken (BVR) is the nationwide representative body of the Cooperative Financial Group. It operates under the Deutscher Genossenschafts- und Raiffeisenverband, the umbrella organization of the German cooperative movement.

History

Founders' era

In the later 1840s, economist Franz Hermann Schulze-Delitzsch started organizing the creation of cooperatives by local communities of craftsmen or farmers in his home town of Delitzsch, in the Prussian Province of Saxony, and promoted national legislation to encourage it. The next year in 1850, Schulze-Delitzsch created another association for advance payments to craftsmen in Delitzsch. 

Raiffeisen considered joining Schulze-Delitzsch’s  initiative, but eventually concluded that the needs of rural communities were different from the ones of town craftsmen which were Schulze-Delitzsch’s focus. In 1876, Raiffeisen created a financial institution in Neuwied to serve the network, which in 1926 was renamed . In 1877, he created the Bar Association of Rural Cooperatives , the first national body for his rural cooperative movement. In 1910, that association’s headquarters was relocated from Neuwied to Berlin, and in 1917 it was renamed the General Association of German Raiffeisen Cooperatives.

In 1872, another social reformer, created an agricultural purchasers’ association  in Friedberg, Grand Duchy of Hesse. A few months later, 15 other rural purchasing cooperatives joined it to form the Association of Hessian Agricultural Purchasing Associations (. In July 1883, Haas expanded his initiative into a national body, the Union of German Agricultural Cooperatives in Darmstadt, which was later renamed the National Association of German Agricultural Cooperatives and moved to Berlin in 1913.

Helped by new legislation on limited liability, the number of cooperative banks in Prussia doubled between 1895 and 1900.

As a consequence, there were four separate networks of cooperative banks by the start of the 20th century.

Restructuring and consolidation in the 20th century

In 1904, its losses led it to merge into Dresdner Bank, which set up specialized departments in Berlin and Frankfurt to serve its cooperative clientele. In subsequent years, Haas's  in turn went into distress and eventually an orderly liquidation in 1912, and the  met the same fate in 1913.

With around 36,000 member cooperatives and four million individual cooperators, it was the largest cooperative organization in the world.

In 1933, like other civil society organizations, the cooperative movement became the target of the Nazi government's Gleichschaltung policy of eradicating diversity and dissent. The 's president Andreas Hermes was swiftly arrested and replaced by Nazi Richard Walther Darré, and the Raiffeisen movement was incorporated into the Nazi agrarian movement, the Reichsnährstand. On , the DGV first formalized mutual protection and deposit guarantee arrangements for its member banks, allowing the BVR to claim in 2022 that "The protection scheme run by the Cooperative Financial Network is therefore the world's oldest exclusively privately financed deposit guarantee fund for banks." During World War II, savings were directed towards investment in government bonds as part of the regime's policy of financial repression.

At the end of the war, the  found itself in the Soviet occupation zone. In 1956, Union Investment was created in Frankfurt to provide asset management services to the  network.

The negotiations were completed in 1972 with the creation of the Bundesverband der Deutschen Volksbanken und Raiffeisenbanken (BVR) in Bonn. At the same time, many local cooperatives merged, and regional organizations were consolidated. In 1975, new federal legislation redefined the role of the DGK, renamed it DG Bank, and allowed it to gradually take over the Cooperative Group's regional financial institutions. The next year, DG Bank started developing an international network, with its first offices abroad established in New York and Hong Kong. In the mid-1980s the cooperative group's regional structures in Bavaria ran into financial difficulties, and were taken over by DG Bank. This triggered a debate on the structure of the group, either with two tiers (local and federal) or three (with an intermediate regional level). In July 1990, with German reunification, DG Bank assumed the role of central financial institution for the still existing and new  in East Germany. In 1998, DG Bank was converted into a joint-stock company, and the cooperatives purchased the shares owned by the German federal government.

21st century developments

In 2001, DG Bank and GZ-Bank merged to form DZ Bank (for ), headquartered in Frankfurt. In 2016, DZ Bank in turn absorbed WGZ Bank of Düsseldorf, thus completing the Cooperative Group's transformation into a two-tier structure that had started in the 1980s.

Group structure and operations

The Cooperative Group's entities, which are also directly or indirectly member institutions of the BVR, include:
 14 PSD Banks, cooperative banks whose name is an acronym for "post, savings and loan associations"; 
 11 Sparda-Banks, cooperative banks whose name is a portmanteau also referring to savings and loans; 
 Deutsche Apotheker- und Ärztebank, the cooperative banks of German physicians and pharmacists, headquartered in Dusseldorf; 
 BBBank, a cooperative private banking specialist in Karlsruhe; 
  in Munich. 

Institutional Protection Scheme

The core financial structure of the Cooperative Financial Group is its Institutional Protection Scheme (IPS), a mutual support arrangement in accordance to Article 113(7) of the EU Capital Requirements Regulation. As of end-March 2022, the Cooperative IPS included a total of 781 entities. 

As with the Sparkassen-Finanzgruppe, the interventions of the Cooperative Group IPS are generally not made public. The International Monetary Fund disclosed in 2016 that the IPS had provided support to member banks in two cases in 2011, for a total intervention amount of €114 million, and again in 2013 and 2014 for €11 million in each case.

National representation

The Bundesverband der Deutschen Volksbanken und Raiffeisenbanken (BVR) represents the Cooperative Financial Group nationally and before European institutions.

Supervision

The entities of the Cooperative Financial Group are separately supervised, unlike other cooperative groups with similar structures such as Groupe BPCE and Crédit Mutuel in France, OP Financial Group in Finland, and Rabobank in the Netherlands, whose name also refers to Raiffeisen. The ECB and BaFin work together on the assessment of the Cooperative IPS.

Deposit insurance

As a consequence of the EU Deposit Guarantee Scheme Directive (DGSD) and the broader policy of European Banking union, the BVR has set up a statutory deposit insurance scheme, in addition to its pre-existing IPS and operated by a separate legal entity,  (BVR-ISG). BVR-ISG is recognized as a deposit guarantee scheme under DGSD; it operates alongside the IPS and in coordination with it, with a liability arrangement that ensures that the IPS funds are readily available to BVR-ISG.

Accounting

The BVR publishes consolidated financial statements of the Cooperative Financial Group, in line with the reporting requirements for institutional protection schemes set out in Article 113(7)(e) of the EU Capital Requirements Regulation. These financial statements are prepared in line with International Financial Reporting Standards. They are not reviewed by an external auditor. Separately, DZ Bank publishes audited consolidated financial statements.

International activities

The Cooperative Financial Group's operations are predominantly domestic in Germany. Even for the central financial institution DZ Bank, Germany represented 88.3 percent of total operating income in 2020.

Branding

Other local banks have kept a pre-existing name that predates the constitution of the Cooperative Group as a national network. 

With the increased integration of the formerly separate Volksbanken and Raiffeisenbanken networks, the Cooperative Group has created a blue-orange color code that blends features of the two previous logos, respectively a stylized "V" and a house gable motif with sculpted horseheads, the latter already present during Raiffeisen's lifetime. The new logo has been adopted by most of the group's cooperative member banks, with few exceptions such as Bausparkasse Schwäbisch Hall which has kept its historic red-yellow logo.

See also
 List of co-operative banks in Germany
Banking networks or groups inspired by Friedrich Wilhelm Raiffeisen in other countries: 
 Raiffeisen Bankengruppe in Austria
 KBC Group in Belgium
 Crédit Mutuel in France
 Raiffeisen Landesbank Südtirol – Cassa Centrale Raiffeisen dell'Alto Adige in Italy
 Banque Raiffeisen in Luxembourg
 Rabobank in the Netherlands
 Raiffeisen (Switzerland)

Notes

External links 
 https://www.vr.de/

Banking in Germany
Cooperative banks of Germany